Digitek (Jonathan Bryant) is a fictional character appearing in American comic books published by Marvel Comics. He first appeared in Digitek #1 (Dec. 1992), the first issue of a limited series published by Marvel UK. The strip was also published in Marvel UK's weekly anthology title Overkill.  The character was created by writers John Tomlinson & Andy Lanning and artist Dermot Power.

Publication history
Digitek was initially published in two different formats - as a four issue limited series, using the standard Marvel Comics format, and as one of the strips in the UK anthology Overkill (published in a format similar to that of 2000 AD. The inside front covers of the limited series featured 'in-universe' text pieces (such as memos from the fictional Nakasoni Corporation) that established links between Digitek and the other Marvel UK titles (such as Warheads and Genetix) - these documents were not reprinted in the Overkill anthology.

At the time, this was a standard publication method for Marvel UK, with the intention that Overkill would be better suited to the UK market, whereas the 'standard' Marvel format would be better suited to comic shops in other countries. As with most of the other Marvel UK titles, Digitek also attempted to attract existing Marvel Comics fans by including a prominent Marvel character in the initial storyline - the cyborg Deathlok.

After the initial limited series, Digitek made no further appearances in Marvel UK comics (and within a couple of years, the Marvel UK line of comics had ceased publication) - the character made no other actual appearances until 2009, though he was mentioned by Robbie Baldwin during the Civil War event and in referred to by a character in Captain Britain and MI13. He also received an entry in the most recent Official Handbook of the Marvel Universe.

The final issue of Captain Britain and MI13 included a cameo appearance by Digitek, confirming that he is working as a reserve agent for MI:13.

Fictional character biography
The story of Digitek begins at the Mys-Tech organization. Kether Troop, a team of Mys-Tech mercenaries tasked with recovering alien technology from alternate dimensions, manage to retrieve a product called Protosilicon from an unknown source and installs it on an item known as Jump 61. Technological analysis of the item followed, and Jonathan Byrant is assigned as its Project Leader. His supervisor, Mr. Grant, sabotages the project with a computer virus, but Jonathan somehow gains a vision of this. He rushes back to the facility. He arrives just as the building explodes, and is believed to have been killed. Unknown to all he survives and finds that the suit has bonded with him. Choosing to use his powers for good, Jonathan decides to call himself after the project: Digitek. His first opponents are the villains known as Bacillicons, three mercenaries who had been similarly transformed, but are warped by the virus.

When Psi-Key is attacked by the virus, she broadcasts a worldwide distress signal, which locks onto the cyborg hero Deathlok. Deathlok is then transported to the UK. Together the two heroes defeat the Bacillicons, parting as friends.

Civil War and MI:13
Digitek is later mentioned as having joined the heroes opposing the Super Hero Registration Act during the Superhuman Civil War. Apprehended by S.H.I.E.L.D., Digitek seemingly commits suicide by transforming his arm into an M-110 particle shotgun and shooting himself. S.H.I.E.L.D. considers Digitek's suicide to be a possible hoax to allow the vigilante to escape from the Negative Zone Prison, as his CPU did not suffer terminal damage.

Digitek later appears, alive and unharmed, as one of British intelligence agency MI:13's reserve agents, battling against an army of vampires on the Moon. The caption accompanying his reintroduction stated that he is "back from intelligence gathering in the USA".

Notes

References

Digitek at the Appendix to the Handbook of the Marvel Universe

Digitek at the Big Comic Book DataBase

1992 comics debuts
Characters created by Andy Lanning
Comics by Andy Lanning
Marvel Comics superheroes
Marvel UK characters
Marvel UK titles